Zhiryatino is a rural locality (a selo) and the administrative center of Zhiryatinsky District, Bryansk Oblast, Russia. Population:

References

Notes

Sources

Rural localities in Zhiryatinsky District